

Plants

Newly named angiosperms

Arthropods

Newly named insects

Dinosaurs

Newly named dinosaurs
Data courtesy of George Olshevsky's dinosaur genera list.

Synapsids

Non-mammalian

References

1920s in paleontology
Paleontology
Paleontology 1